Richard Gerald Wilkinson (born 1943) is a British social epidemiologist, author, advocate, and left-wing political activist. He is Professor Emeritus of social epidemiology at the University of Nottingham, having retired in 2008. He is also Honorary Professor of Epidemiology and Public Health at University College London and Visiting Professor at University of York. In 2009, Richard co-founded The Equality Trust. Richard was awarded a 2013 Silver Rose Award from Solidar for championing equality and the 2014 Charles Cully Memorial Medal by the Irish Cancer Society.

He is best known for his book with Kate Pickett The Spirit Level, first published in 2009, which argues that societies with more equal distribution of incomes have better health, fewer social problems such as violence, drug abuse, teenage births, mental illness, obesity, and others, and are more cohesive than ones in which the gap between the rich and poor is greater.

Background
Richard Wilkinson was educated at Leighton Park School and Reading Technical College. He studied economic history at the London School of Economics. He then earned a Masters at the University of Pennsylvania. His University of Nottingham Masters of Medical Science thesis was "Socio-economic Factors in Mortality Differentials" (1976).

Career
Wilkinson's first book, Poverty and Progress was published by Methuen in 1973. He was a research student on a Health Education Council fellowship at the Department of Community Health, University of Nottingham and spent a year on a large-scale computer analysis of the possible causes of different health outcomes and social strata.

On 16 December 1976, his article entitled 'Dear David Ennals' was published in New Society; at that time, David Ennals was Secretary of State for Social Services. The article led eventually to the 1980 publication of the Black Report on Inequalities in Health. He was also Senior Research Fellow at the Trafford Centre for Medical Research of the University of Sussex in 2001.

From 1976 onwards his career focused on research into social class differences in health, the social determinants of health, and on the health and social effects of income inequality. He has authored hundreds of research articles, chapters and books, several with his colleague and partner, Kate Pickett.  He received the Solidar's Silver Rose Award in 2013, Community Access Unlimited's Humanitarian award in 2013, the Irish Cancer Society's Charles Cully Memorial medal in 2014, and was The Australian Society for Medical Research's medallist in 2017.

Wilkinson retired from his post as a professor of social epidemiology at the University of Nottingham in 2008. He was awarded the title of Emeritus Professor. He is also Honorary Professor at University College London. In 2009 Richard Wilkinson and Kate Pickett founded the Equality Trust, which seeks to explain the benefits of a more equal society and campaigns for greater income equality.

Politics
In August 2015, Wilkinson endorsed Jeremy Corbyn's campaign in the Labour Party leadership election.

Personal life
Richard Wilkinson and Kate Pickett, the authors of The Spirit Level: Why More Equal Societies Almost Always Do Better, are a couple.

Publications

Books
 
 
 
Introduction Chapter 1: The evidence Chapter 2: Inequalities in health Chapter 3: How income affects health Chapter 4: Public health policies for the future Chapter 5: Reforming social security Chapter 6: Reforming taxation Endnote Associated conference, November 1992
 
 
 
 
 
 
 
 
  Four volume set.
Contents: 
volume 1. Health inequalities: the evidence
volume 2. Health inequalities: causes and pathways
volume 3. Health inequalities : interventions and evaluations
volume 4. The political, social and biological ecology of health
 
Adapted as the 2016 documentary film The Divide. Wilkinson and Pickett each appear as commentators.

Articles and papers
  Discussion paper 17.
 Wilkinson, Richard G. (2002). Germany, Britain & the coming of War in 1914. History Review. Issue 42 March 2002

Other
 Further journal articles listed and some downloadable at Scientific Commons
 Some further titles are listed here.
2008 Eve Saville Memorial Lecture: "Inequality: The obstacle between us", at the Centre for Crime and Justice Studies at King's College London School of Law.
 Appearance in 2011 documentary,

References

External links
 The Equality Trust
 Wilkinson's contributions at The Guardian
 BBC article on the Equality Trust
 TED 2011 video: How economic inequality harms societies (16:54)
 Wilkinson's talks for the Socialist Health Association

1943 births
Living people
20th-century British writers
21st-century British writers
Academics of the University of Nottingham
Academics of the University of York
British epidemiologists
English tax resisters